Botne is a former municipality in Vestfold county, Norway.

The parish of Botne was established as a municipality January 1, 1838 (see formannskapsdistrikt). According to the 1835 census the municipality had a population of 1,600. In 1942 a part of Botne with 148 inhabitants was moved to Holmestrand, and in 1947 a part with 8 inhabitants was moved to Våle. On 1 January 1964 the rest of Botne was incorporated into Holmestrand. Prior to the merger Botne had a population of 5,656.

The name
The municipality (originally the parish) was named after the old farm Botne (Norse Botnar), since the first church was built there. The name is the plural form of botn m 'bottom, hollow, depression'.

Botne Church
Botne Church (Botne kirke) is a stone church. It dates from the 13th century.  The church is dedicated to St. Nicholas. There is rectangular nave and lower and narrower choir. The Renaissance / Baroque  altarpiece is from 1664 and consists of four pictures from the gospels. The pulpit is from 1634 with five subjects with evangelists and painted in large fields. The baptismal font is also from the 1600s and has an octagonal basin with painted biblical scenes on four sides.

Botne church was expanded in 1865 and restored in 1947. In 1865 the ridge turret was replaced by a tower in the west and with a gable roof at the east end of the choir. The ceiling was paneled, new hardwood floors replaced the stone floor, new gallery at the west wall, larger gallery at the north wall and new benches. During a restoration in 1947, the chancel screen and the north gallery were  removed and west gallery was renewed. The church got a new altar and paintings on the north wall were uncovered.

References

Other sources

Former municipalities of Norway